Salvador "Salva" Sevilla López (born 18 March 1984) is a Spanish professional footballer who plays for Deportivo Alavés as a central midfielder.

Club career
Born in Berja, Province of Almería, Andalusia, Sevilla finished his development with local club Polideportivo Ejido. He made his professional debut on 12 October 2003, starting in a 2–2 away draw against Ciudad de Murcia in the Segunda División.

Sevilla was loaned to Atlético Madrid in summer 2004, but only appeared for its B and C sides. The following year he joined another reserve team, Sevilla Atlético also of the second division.

On 10 July 2008, Sevilla moved to UD Salamanca in the same league. He scored a career-best 11 goals in his second season, and joined Real Betis shortly after.

In his first year with the Verdiblancos, Sevilla contributed three goals in 33 matches to help his team to return to La Liga after a two-year absence. He made his top-flight debut on 27 August 2011, featuring 86 minutes of the 1–0 win at Granada CF.

Sevilla scored his first goal in the Spanish top tier on 18 September 2011, through a penalty kick in a 3–2 away victory over Athletic Bilbao. His second came in the same fashion against Real Zaragoza (4–3 win, home), and he finished the campaign with 19 starts and 1,446 minutes of action as Betis retained their league status.

On 13 March 2014, in only his seventh career game in the UEFA Europa League, Sevilla came on as a second-half substitute for Rubén Castro in the round-of-16 tie against former club Sevilla FC, and netted the last goal in the 2–0 away win. He signed a three-year contract with RCD Espanyol as a free agent in the summer, scoring the first goal of 2015–16 which was the game's only one at home against Getafe CF.

On 28 August 2017, 33-year-old Sevilla joined RCD Mallorca of Segunda División B on a free transfer. He was an undisputed starter for a side that achieved two consecutive promotions under Vicente Moreno, culminating with the 3–0 defeat of Deportivo de La Coruña on 23 June 2019 in the play-offs to overcome a 2–0 deficit from the first leg, with him scoring in the 62nd minute.

On 28 May 2022, Sevilla agreed to a one-year deal at Deportivo Alavés, recently relegated to division two.

Personal life
Sevilla's older brother, José Antonio, was also a footballer. A central defender, his most notable club was Poli Ejido.

Career statistics

Club

References

External links

LaLiga profile

1984 births
Living people
Sportspeople from the Province of Almería
Spanish footballers
Footballers from Andalusia
Association football midfielders
La Liga players
Segunda División players
Segunda División B players
Polideportivo Ejido footballers
Atlético Madrid C players
Atlético Madrid B players
Sevilla Atlético players
UD Salamanca players
Real Betis players
RCD Espanyol footballers
RCD Mallorca players
Deportivo Alavés players